Amreli may refer to:

 Amreli, a city in Amreli district
 Amreli (Lok Sabha constituency)
 Amreli (Vidhan Sabha constituency)
 Amreli Airport, an airstrip located in Amreli, India. It has a runway 1,260 metres (4,130 ft) long and was built by the government of Gujarat province
 Amreli district, one of the 33 administrative districts of the state of Gujarat in western India